BMIC can stand for:

Bangalore–Mysore Infrastructure Corridor
Bay Mills Indian Community
Berkeley Mobile International Collaborative
Boston Musical Instrument Company
British Music Information Centre
1-butyl-3-methylimidazolium chloride